Michael Anthony LePond III (born 1966), is an American musician from Newark, New Jersey. LePond has recorded over 40 albums with various bands and has appeared on over 20 other albums in a guest capacity. 

Best known as the current bassist of the progressive metal band Symphony X, LePond joined the band in 1999 and can be heard on all albums since the release of V: The New Mythology Suite in 2000. He has also worked with a number of bands within the European metal scene, and has released 4 solo albums with Mike LePond's Silent Assassins.

Biography 
In 1979, at the age of 13, LePond attended a Kiss concert in Madison Square Garden, New York. Upon seeing the performances of Gene Simmons, LePond decided "that's what I wanna do!" LePond's father soon bought him a Univox bass guitar and a 150 watt amplifier. LePond took lessons from a jazz musician for approximately one year, learning music theory and sight reading, but did not feel strongly for the genre and instead oped to self-teach. LePond was introduced to Rush, Black Sabbath and Iron Maiden through friends, and has since cited bassists Geddy Lee, Geezer Butler and Steve Harris as influences to his style of playing.

In 1999, LePond was introduced to Symphony X guitarist Michael Romeo through a mutual friend. Romeo invited LePond to audition for Symphony X, as the band were in need of a bass player following the departures of Thomas Miller and touring musician Andy DeLuca. LePond was sent a copy of The Divine Wings of Tragedy, and was required to learn 3 songs for the audition, later recalling how challenging the material was to learn. A second auditon was arranged, this time with 2 songs from Twilight in Olympus. He has gone on to record 5 albums with the band.

In May 2006, LePond was diagnosed with Crohn's disease following hospitalisation for abdominal pain. LePond required surgery, causing Symphony X to cancel festival appearances in Spain and Sweden. On May 31, LePond announced his recovery on Symphony X's website.

In 2012, LePond formed progressive metal supergroup Affector with drummer Collin Leijenaar, vocalist Ted Leonard and guitarist Daniel Fries. The band's first album, Harmagedon, was released on May 21. The album includes guest keyboard players Jordan Rudess, Derek Sherinian, Neal Morse and Alex Argento.

On August 21, 2014, it was announced that LePond would be releasing his first solo album, Mike LePond's Silent Assassins. The album was released on September 26, featuring LePond on bass and rhythm guitars. Symphony X bandmate Michael Romeo provided drum programming and some guitar work on the album, with vocals provided by Alan Tecchio (Hades, Watchtower) and additional guitar work from Mike Chlasciak (Halford, Testament).

Equipment
Upon joining Symphony X, LePond was playing a red 1987 Hamer Scarab 4-string bass, which was featured on the releases V: The New Mythology Suite and Live on the Edge of Forever. The instrument was used on tour with Symphony X up to 2002 and was later auctioned off by the band.

For the Paradise Lost album, he used a Caparison Dellinger bass guitar, Madison 8x10 cabinet and a Tech 21 RBI preamp.
Live, he uses a Fender Precision bass guitar and a Hamer Cruise as back up, amplified by an Ampeg 4x10 Classic cabinet and an Ampeg B2-R head. In the past he has been known to use Hamer Scarab and Musicman Sterling bass guitars.

Discography

With Dead on Arrival 

 Alive And Kickin''' (1995)

 With Symphony X 

 V: The New Mythology Suite (2000)
 The Odyssey (2002)
 Paradise Lost (2007)
 Iconoclast (2011)
 Underworld (2015)

 With Distant Thunder 

 Welcome The End (2004)

 With Operatika 

 The Calling (2008)

 With Mike Bino Project 

 On the Verge of Reality (2010)

 With Holy Force 

 Holy Force (2011)

 With Seven Witches 

 Call Upon The Wicked (2011)

 With Affector 

 Harmagedon (2012)

 With Ashenveil 

 Black of Light (2012)

 With Epysode 

 Fantasmagoria (2013)

 With Lalu 

 Atomic Ark (2013)

 With Mike LePond's Silent Assassins 

 Mike LePond's Silent Assassins (2014)
 Pawn And Prophecy (2018)
 Whore of Babylon (2020)
 With Mindmaze 

 Back From The Edge (2014)

 With AREA51 

 Judge The Joker (2014)

 With Starbynary 

 Dark Passenger (2014)

 With Heathens Rage 
 Knights of Steel (2015)

 With Ureas 

 The Black Heart Album (2015)

 With Waken Eyes 
 Exodus (2015)

 With Elegacy 
 The Binding Sequence (2015)

 With Anuryzm 

 All Is Not For All (2015)

 With Last Union 
 Most Beautiful Day (2016)

 With Them 
 Sweet Hollow (2016)
 Manor Of The Se7en Gables (2018)

 With Burnt City 
 Resurgence (2017)

 With Tomorrow's Eve 
 Mirror Of Creation III - Project Ikaros (2018)

 With Ross the Boss 
 By Blood Sworn (2018)

 As a guest 

 With Jack Frost 
 "Brotherhood of Lies" and "Slow Burn" (Raise Your Fist to Metal) – Frost (2003)
 Various (Out in the Cold) – Frost (2005)

 With Terry Ilous 
 Various (Here And Gone) – Terry Ilous (2007)

 With Michael Angelo Batio 
 "Juggernaut" (Intermezzo) – Michael Angelo Batio (2013)

 With Embrace of Disharmony 
 "The Edge Of Nowhere" (Humananke) – Embrace of Disharmony (2014)

 With Telegry 
 Various (Hypatia) – Telergy (2015)

 With Marius Danielsen 
 "Mirror of Truth" (The Legend Of Valley Doom Part 1) – Marius Danielsen (2015)

 With The V 
 Various (Now or Never) – The V (2015)

 With Mindmaze 
 Various (Dreamwalker) – Mindmaze (2015)

 "Remember (Acoustic)" (Mask of Lies) – Mindmaze (2017)

 With Silvertrain 

 Various (Walls of Insanity) – Silvertrain (2016)

 With Universal Mind Project 
 "Truth" and "The Force Of Our Creation" (The Jaguar Priest) – Universal Mind Project (2016)

 With Vivaldi Metal Project 

 "The Age Of Dreams (Autumn #1 - Allegro)" (The Four Seasons) – Vivaldi Metal Project (2016)

 With Midnight Eternal 
 "When Love And Faith Collide" (Midnight Eternal) – Midnight Eternal (2016)

 With Enbound 
 "Feel My Flame" (The Blackened Heart) – Enbound (2016)

 With Myrkgand 
 "Mysterious Malediction" (Myrkgand) – Myrkgand (2017)

 With Aldaria 
 "Land Of Light" (Land Of Light) – Aldaria (2017)

 With Kiko Dittert 
 "Black And White" (Black And White'') – Kiko Dittert (2017)

References

External links
 Interview with Michael Lepond at IndianMusicMug

1966 births
Living people
Musicians from Newark, New Jersey
American heavy metal bass guitarists
American male bass guitarists
Progressive metal bass guitarists
Symphony X members
Guitarists from New Jersey
Seven Witches members
20th-century American bass guitarists
20th-century American male musicians
American people of Italian descent